Jevíčko is a town in Svitavy District in the Pardubice Region of the Czech Republic. It has about 2,800 inhabitants. The historic town centre is well preserved and is protected by law as an urban monument zone.

Administrative parts

The village of Zadní Arnoštov is an administrative part of Jevíčko.

Geography
The eastern part of the municipal territory with the town proper lies in the Boskovice Furrow depression.

Jevíčko is located on the Malonínský Stream. The stream flows into the Jevíčka River, which partly creates the eastern border of the municipal territory. North of the town is the Finsterl Deep, an artificially created body of water with islands and peninsulas serving as a biocentre.

History

Jevíčko was founded in the first half of the 13th century on the trade route from Olomouc to Prague. The first written mention of Jevíčko is from 1249. In 1258, Jevíčko was promoted to a royal town by Ottokar II. It was owned by the kings until 1499.

The town had a significant Jewish community. The community began to form from the 15th century and in the mid-19th century, Jews made up a third of the population.

Sights

Jevíčko centre has preserved the medieval layout of the streets with Palackého Square in the middle. The centre was delimited by stone town walls built in the 14th century, whose fragments are still visible. The originally Gothic town tower has been also preserved and nowadays serves as an observation tower.

The former Augustinian monastery was founded in the 14th century and abolished in 1784. Today a part of the premises houses the Town Museum. The adjacent Church of the Assumption of the Virgin Mary was built in 1762–1766. It has valuable Baroque interiors. The second church in the town is the Church of Saint Bartholomew, a small Neo-Gothic cemetery church from 1936.

The former synagogue was built in 1794 and replaced a wooden synagogue destroyed by fire in 1747. Today the building serves cultural and religious purposes.

The Renaissance castle was built in 1559 and rebuilt in 18th century to it current form. Nowadays it houses a library and a school.

Notable people
Richard Fall (1882–1945), Austrian composer and conductor
Julius Mackerle (1909–1988), inventor and automobile engineer
František Lízna (1941–2021), Jesuit priest

Twin towns – sister cities

Jevíčko is twinned with:
 Abasha, Georgia
 Martvili, Georgia

References

External links

Cities and towns in the Czech Republic
Populated places in Svitavy District